Moshannon Creek is a  tributary of the West Branch Susquehanna River in Centre County, Pennsylvania in the United States. Throughout its length, it serves as the boundary between Centre and Clearfield counties.

The name Moshannon is said to be derived from the Native American "Moss-Hanne," meaning "moose stream." However, as recognized by Gertler,  the North American moose was not native to central Pennsylvania. More likely, the name means "elk stream" from the Lenape word Mos'hanna'unk, which means "elk river place." See Handbook of tribal names of Pennsylvania, together with signification of Indian words ; also A History of Great Council of Pennsylvania with articles pertaining to the Improved Order of Red Men by Donnalley, Thomas K. Published 1908, page 40.

Moshannon Creek, commonly called the Red Moshannon or Red Mo, is noted for its reddish-orange rocks, banks and water caused by an iron compound that precipitates out of the acidic waters that seep into the stream from numerous old coal and clay mines in the basin.

While the acidity is a detriment to fish, wild cranberry appear to thrive in the environment.

The name Red Mo is also used to distinguish it from the smaller tributary Black Moshannon Creek which joins the Red where PA Route 53 crosses the creek.

The Red Moshannon is the site of an annual canoe and kayak race known as the Red Moshannon Downriver Race which has been held on the last Saturday in March since 1967. The course record is 39 minutes, 29 seconds, set in 1993 by Brad Nelson. 

Moshannon Creek joins the West Branch Susquehanna River, opposite an area known as Miller's Landing, approximately 3.4 miles (5.5 km) upstream of Karthaus.

Tributaries
Ames Run
Sevenmile Run
Black Moshannon Creek
Crawford Run
Weber Run
Browns Run
Laurel Run
Potter Run
Tark Hill Run
Six Mile Run
Black Bear Run
Sulphur Run
Hawk Run
Onemile Run
Emigh Run
Cold Stream
Laurel Run
Big Run
Shimel Run
Beaver Run
Bear Run
Mountain Branch
Whiteside Run
Roup Run
Wilson Run

See also
List of rivers of Pennsylvania

References

External links
"Moshannon Creek, Pennsylvania, US", American Whitewater

Rivers of Pennsylvania
Tributaries of the West Branch Susquehanna River
Rivers of Centre County, Pennsylvania
Rivers of Clearfield County, Pennsylvania